Chauviré is a surname. Notable people with the surname include: 

Cécile Mourer-Chauviré (born 1939), French paleontologist
Roger Chauviré (1880–1957), French writer
Yvette Chauviré (1917–2016), French prima ballerina and actress

French-language surnames